GCDA may refer to:

 Government Car and Despatch Agency, an executive agency of the UK Department for Transport
 Greater Cochin Development Authority, statutory body overseeing the development of the City of Kochi in the state of Kerala, India